The 1981 NCAA Division I basketball tournament involved 48 schools playing in single-elimination play to determine the national champion of men's  NCAA Division I college basketball. It began on March 12, 1981, and ended with the championship game on March 30 in Philadelphia. A total of 48 games were played, including a national third-place game (the last in the NCAA tournament). It was also the last tournament to be televised on NBC, before CBS took over the following year. Additionally, it was the last season in which the NCAA sponsored championships only in men's sports; the first Division I women's tournament would be played the following year.

Indiana, coached by Bob Knight, won the national title with a 63–50 victory over North Carolina, coached by Dean Smith. Isiah Thomas of Indiana was named the Tournament's Most Outstanding Player.

The March 14 upsets

The date of Saturday, March 14, 1981, resulted in three major second round tournament upsets which were decided by last-second baskets.

St. Joseph's trailed No. 1 seed DePaul by seven at about the midway point of the second half, in an early afternoon Mideast Region game from Dayton, Ohio. However, with under a minute left, the Hawks had rallied to within one point, 48–47. Blue Demons guard Skip Dillard was fouled with 13 seconds left. Dillard was known as 'Money' for his superb free throw shooting, but he missed the front end of a one-and-one opportunity, and St. Joseph's got the rebound, then quickly passed the ball to the front court without calling a timeout. Guard Bryan Warrick got the ball to freshman Lonnie McFarlan who was wide open in the right corner. McFarlan began to shoot until forward John Smith yelled "Please!" to him. McFarlan passed to Smith, who was open underneath the basket. Smith's layup with two seconds left enabled the Hawks of coach Jim Lynam to stun the Blue Demons of Ray Meyer, 49–48.

Later in the afternoon in Austin, Texas, Arkansas coach Eddie Sutton called timeout with 5 seconds left after falling behind Louisville in the Midwest Region, 73–72 on a jumper by guard Derek Smith. Sutton told his team to get the ball to U.S. Reed. The Razorbacks' guard dribbled to near half court, then launched a 49-foot shot that beat the buzzer and swished through the net, as Arkansas dethroned the defending national champion Cardinals of Denny Crum, 74–73. Sutton told the media, "Champions die hard."

Only moments after the Razorbacks' upset, the season ended for another #1 seed in the West Region in Los Angeles. Oregon State led Kansas State by as much as 11 points in the second half. Coach Ralph Miller and center Steve Johnson had led the Beavers to a two-year record of 52–4. Then Rolando Blackman led the Wildcats back with a 16–6 run to tie the game, 48–48 with 3:23 left. Johnson then fouled out, and both teams stalled with the ball until Oregon State missed the front end of a one-and-one from the foul line. K-State then held for the last shot. With two seconds left, Blackman, double-teamed, drilled a fall-away 17 footer from the right baseline for a 50–48 upset by the Wildcats of Jack Hartman.

In another second round Mideast Region upset, UAB defeated Kentucky 69–62. A semifinal in the East Region saw Danny Ainge dribble the length of the court and drive all the way in for a layup and another buzzer-beating winner, lifting BYU over Notre Dame 51–50.

Greg Johnson of NCAA.com, in a March 9, 2011 article, indicated that March 14, 1981 was a date which defined March Madness.

Schedule and venues

The following are the sites that were selected to host each round of the 1981 tournament:

First and Second rounds
March 12 and 14
East Region
 Providence Civic Center, Providence, Rhode Island
Mideast Region
 University of Dayton Arena, Dayton, Ohio
Midwest Region
 Frank Erwin Center, Austin, Texas
West Region
 Pauley Pavilion, Los Angeles, California
March 13 and 15
East Region
 Charlotte Coliseum, Charlotte, North Carolina
Mideast Region
 Memorial Coliseum, Tuscaloosa, Alabama
Midwest Region
 Levitt Arena, Wichita, Kansas
West Region
 Special Events Center, El Paso, Texas

Regional semifinals and finals (Sweet Sixteen and Elite Eight)
March 19 and 21
East Regional, Omni Coliseum, Atlanta, Georgia
West Regional, Special Events Center, Salt Lake City, Utah
March 20 and 22
Mideast Regional, Assembly Hall, Bloomington, Indiana
Midwest Regional, Louisiana Superdome, New Orleans, Louisiana

National semifinals and championship (Final Four and championship)
March 28 and 30
The Spectrum, Philadelphia, Pennsylvania

Teams

Bracket
* – Denotes overtime period

East region

West region

Mideast region

Midwest region

Final Four

Notes
 This was the last tournament that a third-place game was staged prior to the national championship; every prior championship since 1946 had featured the game. 
 The 1981 tournament holds the record for the most first-time participants. Twelve teams – UAB, Ball State, Chattanooga, Fresno State, Howard, Idaho, James Madison, LIU, Mercer, Mississippi, Northeastern, and Southern – appeared in their first tournament. UAB, coached by Gene Bartow, made it the furthest, reaching the Sweet Sixteen before falling to eventual champion Indiana. The twelve teams beat the previous record of eleven set in 1955. Half of the first time teams would return in 1982, with the longest drought before their second appearance being sixteen years for the Ole Miss Rebels.
 As of 2022, this is the only time all three Division I schools from Kansas--Kansas, Kansas State and Wichita State--have advanced to the Sweet 16. 
 As of 2022 all forty-eight teams in the 1981 tournament have returned to the tournament at least once. This would happen five more times in the 1980s, but has not happened again since 1989.

Announcers (NBC and NCAA Productions)
Dick Enberg, Billy Packer and Al McGuire – Second round at Providence, Rhode Island (UCLA–Brigham Young, Notre Dame–James Madison); Second round at Charlotte, North Carolina (Virginia–Villanova, Tennessee–VCU); East Regional Final at Atlanta, Georgia; Midwest Regional Final at New Orleans, Louisiana; Final Four at Philadelphia, Pennsylvania
Marv Albert and Steve Grote – Mideast Regional Final at Bloomington, Indiana
Don Criqui and Gary Thompson – Second round at Dayton, Ohio (DePaul–St. Joseph's, Indiana–Maryland); West Regional Final at Salt Lake City, Utah (Pittsburgh-North Carolina) 
Bill O'Donnell and Jeff Mullins – East Regional semifinals at Atlanta, Georgia
Jim Thacker and Steve Grote – Mideast Regional semifinals at Bloomington, Indiana
Fred White and Larry Conley – Midwest Regional semifinals at New Orleans, Louisiana
Bob Costas and Gary Thompson – Second round at Tuscaloosa, Alabama (Kentucky–UAB, Wake Forest–Boston College)
Marv Albert and Bucky Waters – Second round at Austin, Texas (LSU–Lamar, Louisville–Arkansas)
Charlie Jones and Lynn Shackelford – Second round at Wichita, Kansas (Iowa–Wichita State, Arizona State–Kansas)
Jay Randolph and Steve Grote – Second round at Los Angeles, California (Oregon State–Kansas State, Illinois–Wyoming)
Merle Harmon and Matt Guokas – Second round at El Paso, Texas (Utah–Northeastern, North Carolina–Pittsburgh)
Tom Hammond and Larry Conley – First round at Tuscaloosa, Alabama (Boston College–Ball State, UAB–Western Kentucky)
Tom Hammond and Gary Thompson-West Regional Semifinals at Salt Lake City, Utah

See also
 1981 NCAA Division II basketball tournament
 1981 NCAA Division III basketball tournament
 1981 National Invitation Tournament
 1981 NAIA Division I men's basketball tournament
 1981 NAIA Division I women's basketball tournament
 1981 National Women's Invitation Tournament

References

External links
 
 1981 NCAA Tournament Summary at Sports-Reference.com

NCAA Division I men's basketball tournament
Ncaa
NCAA Division I men's basketball tournament
NCAA Division I men's basketball tournament
Basketball competitions in Austin, Texas
College sports tournaments in Texas